L'Officiel du jeu Scrabble has been the official dictionary for Francophone Scrabble since January 1, 1990. It is published by Larousse and is often abbreviated to ODS. The current version is ODS8.

History
1990 : Publication of the ODS1, replacing the Petit Larousse Illustré (PLI), used as a reference by players until then.
1994 : Publication of the ODS2, with 1500 new entries, correcting the few mistakes and omissions of the previous version.
1999 : Publication of the ODS3, with 2000 new entries.
2004 : Publication of the ODS4, with 750 new entries.
2008 : Publication of the ODS5, with 2500 new entries.
2011 : Publication of the ODS6. with 1550 new entries.
2015 : Publication of the ODS7. with 1570 new entries
2020 : Publication of the ODS8. with 1600 new entries

Number of words

N.B. A word and its plural form count as a single entry, but as two words

New words
 ODS1 (1990)
 2 letters : BI
 3 letters : ADO, ALU, BOG, DAW, GOS, LEM, LOG, LOS, MAO, MOB, NIF, OYE, PEC, POP, REZ, RIO, ROS, ZOB
 ODS2 (1994)
 2 letters : EX
 3 letters : ASA, BIO, CIF, CUT, FAX, FOG, GÉO, HUN, IBN, IBO, ISO, JAB, KOP, KWA, MAX, MÉO, MIX, MOS, NEM, OLA, OUH, RAC, RAP, TAG, UTE, WOK, YAM
 ODS3 (1999)
 2 letters : AA
 3 letters : AAS, ADA, CIS, CRÉ, DIN, DOC, FAF, IPÉ, IXA, IXÉ, JAM, KYU, MOA, MOX, NAY, NÉO, NEY, OUD, RAM, SAX, SPA, TAR, TIP, WEB, YUE, ZEF
 ODS4 (2004)
 2 letters : none 3 letters : ÉWÉ, HUB, MÉL, PAP, SOM, TAF, TAT, WAD, WAP, ZEC, ZUP
 ODS5 (2008)
 2 letters : BA, BÊ
 3 letters : AÏD, DOP, DUB, ÉCO, EXO, FAQ, GEX, GUR, KÉA, KRU, MMM, MOR, MUG, OBA, PHÔ, QIN, YET, ZEK
 ODS6 (2012)
 2 lettres : OM, TO, UD
 3 lettres : ANI, COM, COX, DAH, DÉO, DZO, FON, KAT, KEN, KET, KOÏ, LED, LUO, NAC, NAN, NIM, SUP, TOF, TOS, UDS, WOH
 ODS7 (2016)
 2 lettres : none
 3 lettres : BEU, COT, DEM, EVE, FIU, GIF, LOA, LOL, OIS, OIT, VOC
 ODS8 (2020)
 2 lettres : QI
 3 lettres : APP, ARF, BIM, DEJ, DEL, DIP, FIX, GHI, MAG, QIS, RIB, TEF

Deleted words
 ODS2 : DISCUTAILLEE, S (transitive verb), ECLOSAI-T/AIENT (wrong conjugated forms of ECLORE), EINSTENIUM, S (wrong spelling of EINSTEINIUM) ; GARDIANNE,S (wrong spelling of GARDIANE) ; GEWURTZTRAMINER (wrong spelling of GEWURZTRAMINER) ; IMMUNOGLOBINE, S (wrong spelling of IMMUNOGLOBULINE) ; SUISSESSE, S (considered as a proper noun), THEPHILLIM (wrong spelling of TEPHILLIM).
 ODS3 : BAGAGERIE, S (registered trademark) ; CHAUVISS-AIENT/AIS/AIT/ANT/EZ/ONS (wrong conjugated forms of CHAUVIR) ; COINTREAU, X (registered trademark) ; DRELINS (becomes invariable) ; DRINGS (becomes invariable) ; PIERRADE, S (registered trademark) ; REVEUILLI-EZ/ONS et VEUILLI-EZ/ONS (wrong conjugated forms of REVOULOIR) ; WILLIAMINE,S (registered trademark).
 ODS4 : SEPTICOPYOEMIE, S (wrong spelling of SEPTICOPYOHEMIE).
 ODS5 : CAROMS (wrong spelling of CARROM).
 ODS6 : PLACOPLATRE, S (registered trademark).
 ODS7 : AFFICIONADO (wrong spelling of AFICIONADO), ZODIAC, ONGLERIE (registered trademark).
 ODS''8 : NEGRO, SILY, CHINETOQUE

External links
 Official FISF page 
 ODS5 online 
 ODS8 info from FISF 

French dictionaries
Scrabble lexica